Hannan District is one of 13 urban districts of the prefecture-level city of Wuhan, the capital of Hubei Province, China. It is the least-populous of Wuhan's districts, and is situated on the northern (left) bank of the Yangtze River. It borders the districts of Caidian to the north and Jiangxia to the east across the Yangtze, as well as the prefecture-level cities of Xianning and Jingzhou (for a sliver) to the south; it also borders the directly administered county-level city of Xiantao to the west.

Geography

Administrative Districts

In 2006, Dengnan Town was made into Dengnan Subdistrict. Since this change, Hannan District has administered four subdistricts:

Transportation
Line 3 (Wuhan Metro) starts from Zhuanyang Boulevard station in the district. Line 16 (Wuhan Metro) serves the district.

References

External links

Geography of Wuhan
County-level divisions of Hubei